The Men's long jump event  at the 2004 IAAF World Indoor Championships was held on March 5–6.

Medalists

Results

Qualification
Qualifying perf. 8.00 (Q) or 8 best performers (q) advanced to the Final.

Final

References
Results

Long
Long jump at the World Athletics Indoor Championships